Elena Cecchini (born 25 May 1992) is an Italian racing cyclist, who currently rides for UCI Women's WorldTeam . She competed in the 2013 UCI women's team time trial in Florence.

Career
In 2013 and 2014, she rode for the  team. In November 2015 she was announced as part of the  team's inaugural squad for the 2016 season. She remained with the team until the end of the 2020 season; in August 2020, she signed a two-year contract with the  team, from the 2021 season.

Personal life
Cecchini is engaged to fellow cyclist Elia Viviani. Cecchini is an athlete of Gruppo Sportivo Fiamme Azzurre.

Major results

Track

2009
 2nd  Points race, UCI Juniors Track World Championships
2010
 UEC European Junior Track Championships
1st  Points race
2nd  Team pursuit
 3rd  Scratch, UCI Junior Track Cycling World Championships
2011
 National Track Championships
2nd Team sprint
3rd Keirin
3rd Scratch
2012
 2nd  Points race, UEC European Under-23 Track Championships
 3rd Team pursuit, National Track Championships
2013
 National Track Championships
1st  Points race
1st  Team pursuit
 3 Jours d'Aigle
1st Points race
2nd Scratch
 3rd  Team pursuit, UEC European Under-23 Track Championships (with Beatrice Bartelloni, Maria Giulia Confalonieri and Chiara Vannucci)
2014
 UEC European Under-23 Track Championships
1st  Points race
3rd  Team pursuit (with Beatrice Bartelloni, Maria Giulia Confalonieri and Francesca Pattaro)
3rd  Scratch
 1st  Team pursuit, National Track Championships
 International Track Women & Men (Under-23)
2nd Scratch
2nd Points race
 UEC European Track Championships
3rd  Points race
3rd  Scratch

Road
Source: 

2009
 1st  Road race, UEC European Junior Road Championships
 5th Road race, UCI Junior World Championships
2010
 6th Road race, UEC European Junior Road Championships
2011
 5th GP Comune di Cornaredo
 10th Overall Giro della Toscana Int. Femminile – Memorial Michela Fanini
2012
 1st Overall Trophée d'Or Féminin
1st Stage 1
 10th Overall Ladies Tour of Qatar
2013
 5th Drentse 8 van Dwingeloo
 10th Classica Citta di Padova
2014
 1st  Road race, National Road Championships
 2nd Road race, UEC European Under-23 Road Championships
 2nd Tour of Chongming Island World Cup
 4th Grand Prix de Dottignies
 5th Winston-Salem Cycling Classic
 6th Overall Tour of Chongming Island
 8th Overall Ladies Tour of Qatar
 10th Overall The Women's Tour
 10th Trofeo Alfredo Binda-Comune di Cittiglio
2015
 1st  Road race, National Road Championships
 1st Stage 1 Festival Luxembourgeois du cyclisme féminin Elsy Jacobs
 1st  Sprints classification Tour Femenino de San Luis
 3rd Overall BeNe Ladies Tour
 3rd Durango-Durango Emakumeen Saria
 4th Overall Belgium Tour
 5th Tour of Flanders for Women
 5th Dwars door de Westhoek
 5th Sparkassen Giro
 6th Omloop Het Nieuwsblad
 6th Grand Prix de Dottignies
 7th Gran Prix San Luis Femenino
 7th GP de Plouay
 7th La Madrid Challenge by La Vuelta
 9th Trofeo Alfredo Binda-Comune di Cittiglio
 10th Le Samyn des Dames
 10th Strade Bianche Women
2016
 1st  Road race, National Road Championships
 1st  Overall Thüringen Rundfahrt der Frauen
 2nd  Team time trial, UCI Road World Championships
 2nd GP de Plouay – Bretagne
 2nd Dwars door de Westhoek
 4th Overall Energiewacht Tour
 8th Omloop van Borsele
 8th Philadelphia Cycling Classic
 9th Chrono Champenois
 10th Overall Gracia–Orlová
2017
 2nd Road race, National Road Championships
 2nd Ronde van Drenthe
 3rd Crescent Vårgårda TTT
 5th Trofeo Alfredo Binda-Comune di Cittiglio
 5th GP de Plouay – Bretagne
 6th Tour of Flanders for Women
 9th Gent–Wevelgem
 10th Road race, UCI Road World Championships
 10th Overall Holland Ladies Tour
 10th Strade Bianche Women
2018
 1st  Team time trial, UCI Road World Championships
 Mediterranean Games
1st  Time trial
9th Road race
 1st  Time trial, National Road Championships
 4th Road race, UEC European Road Championships
 4th Open de Suède Vårgårda
 4th GP de Plouay – Bretagne
 5th Overall Thüringen Rundfahrt der Frauen
1st Stage 2
 10th Overall Holland Ladies Tour
2019
 1st  Time trial, National Road Championships
 2nd  Road race, UEC European Road Championships
 2nd Postnord Vårgårda West Sweden TTT
 4th Dwars door Vlaanderen for Women
 5th Trofeo Alfredo Binda-Comune di Cittiglio
 8th Overall Thüringen Rundfahrt der Frauen
1st Stage 6
 8th Gent–Wevelgem
 9th Durango-Durango Emakumeen Saria
 10th GP de Plouay – Bretagne
2020
 UEC European Road Championships
3rd  Mixed team relay
9th Road race
 5th GP de Plouay
 8th Clasica Femenina Navarra
2021
 1st  Mixed team relay, UEC European Road Championships
 2nd Ronde van Drenthe
 3rd  Mixed team relay, UCI Road World Championships
2022
 2nd  Mixed team relay, UCI Road World Championships
 2nd Postnord Vårgårda WestSweden TTT
 4th Omloop van het Hageland
 5th Trofeo Alfredo Binda
 9th Drentse Acht van Westerveld

References

External links

 
 
 
 
 
 
 

1992 births
Living people
Italian female cyclists
Sportspeople from Udine
Cyclists at the 2015 European Games
European Games competitors for Italy
Cyclists at the 2016 Summer Olympics
Olympic cyclists of Italy
Italian track cyclists
Mediterranean Games gold medalists for Italy
Mediterranean Games medalists in cycling
Competitors at the 2018 Mediterranean Games
Cyclists of Fiamme Azzurre
Cyclists from Friuli Venezia Giulia
20th-century Italian women
21st-century Italian women